The Northern Plains Resource Council (NPRC) is an American grassroots conservation and family agriculture group. The organization was established in 1972 by ranchers in Montana who united in opposition to coal industry efforts to strip mine in the Powder River Basin.

Background
The Fort Union Formation, situated largely under the Powder River Basin, is the richest known coal deposit in the world, with 100 billion tons of coal recoverable by strip mining. In October 1971, one year after the passage of the Clean Water Act, the North Central Power Study was published. The study was written jointly by 35 utilities from Oregon to Illinois along with the United States Bureau of Reclamation. It called for the exploitation of coal reserves west of the Mississippi River and included plans for strip mining and power generation.

History
The Northern Plains Resource Council was formed on April 27, 1972 with the goal of providing a "unified, more powerful counterforce in public 'discussions' with the users of non-renewable resources (minerals), particularly including the coal strip-miners." The foundation was spearheaded by the Rosebud Protective Association and the Bull Mountain Landowners Association with the assistance of environmentalists from the Montana Wildlife Federation and the Sierra Club.

Northern Plains programs
As of 2020, Northern Plains has member task forces that address issues in the following areas:
 Coal
 Oil and Gas
 Keystone XL Pipeline
 Agriculture
 Soil
 Clean Energy
 The Good Neighbor Agreement with the Stillwater Mining Company

Organizational structure
Northern Plains is governed by a Board of Directors, composed of delegates representing its affiliate groups, along with at-large delegates and officers elected annually by the membership.

Northern Plains includes 13 affiliate groups in 10 Montana counties. They include:

 Bear Creek Council (Gardiner area)
 Beartooth Alliance (Cooke City area)
 Bull Mountain Land Alliance (Shepherd area)
 Carbon County Resource Council (Red Lodge area)
 Central Montana Resource Council (Lewistown area)
 Cottonwood Resource Council (Big Timber area)
 Dawson Resource Council (Glendive area)
 McCone Agricultural Protection Organization (Circle area)
 Rosebud Protective Association (Colstrip area)
 Sleeping Giant Citizens Council (Helena area)
 Stillwater Protective Association (Stillwater area)
 Yellowstone Bend Citizens Council (Livingston area)
 Yellowstone Valley Citizens Council (Billings area)

In 1979, Northern Plains co-founded the Western Organization of Resource Councils, a regional network of community organizations that now has member groups in seven Western states.

References

Further reading
 Billings Gazette editorial, “A truce that profits and protects,” May 11, 2000.
 Anne Goddard Charter, Cowboys Don’t Walk: A Tale of Two, Western Organization of Resource Councils, 1999. 
 Kye Cochran, “Cantankerous Cowman Gave Montanans Courage,” High Country News, republished in Mother Earth News, Jan-Feb 1979.
 James Conaway, “The Last of the West: Hell, Strip it!” Atlantic Monthly, Sept. 1973. 
 Patrick Dawson, “A unique outfit marks two decades of scrappy life,” High Country News, Feb. 24, 1992.
 Keith Edgerton, “Bridging Ideology in Rural America: The Northern Plains Resource Council, 1971-1975, unpublished faculty paper, Montana State University – Billings, 2002.
 Cody Ferguson, This is Our Land: Grassroots Environmentalism in the Late Twentieth Century, Rutgers University Press, 2015. 
 Greg Gordon, “Neighborhood Struggles: The Story of the Northern Plains Resource Council,” Orion Afield, Summer 2000. 
 High Country News, “Pat Sweeney and the Northern Plains Resource Council,” Feb. 1, 1974. 
 Alvin M. Josephy Jr., “Agony of the Northern Plains,” Audubon, July 1973.
 Wallace McRae, “Things of Intrinsic Worth,” in Cowboy Curmudgeon and Other Poems, Gibbs-Smith, 1992. 
 The New York Times editorial, “A Promising Accord in Montana,” May 17, 2000.
 Michael Parfit, Last Stand at Rosebud Creek: Coal, Power and People, Dutton, 1980.
 Michael Parfit, “A gathering storm over synfuels on the Big Sky range,” Smithsonian, March 1980. 
 Ray Ring, “Ranchers’ group adopts practical strategy,” High Country News, Dec. 17, 2001.
 Wallace Stegner, “Crow Country,” essay in American Places, Dutton, 1981.
 K. Ross Toole, The Rape of the Great Plains: Northwestern America, Cattle and Coal, Little Brown and Co., 1976.

External links
Northern Plains Research Council
Western Organization of Research Councils
Dakota Resource Council

Environmental organizations based in Montana
Non-profit organizations based in Montana
1972 establishments in Montana